Minerva High School is a public high school in Minerva, Ohio, United States.  It is the only high school in the Minerva Local School District. Athletic teams compete as the Minerva Lions in the Ohio High School Athletic Association as a member of the Eastern Buckeye Conference.

Notable alumni
 Jeff Wallace - former MLB pitcher for the Pittsburgh Pirates and the Tampa Bay Devil Rays
 Carol Costello - American news anchor and former host of CNN Newsroom

References

External links 
 District Website

Educational institutions in the United States with year of establishment missing
High schools in Stark County, Ohio
Public high schools in Ohio